Dursun Sevinç (born 16 March 1972 in Ankara, Turkey) is a Turkish weightlifter competing in the –85 kg division.

Achievements
World Weightlifting Championships

European Weightlifting Championships

Mediterranean Games

European Junior Weightlifting Championships

References

External links
Dursun Sevinç at Database Weightlifting

Living people
1972 births
Sportspeople from Ankara
Turkish male weightlifters
Weightlifters at the 1996 Summer Olympics
Olympic weightlifters of Turkey
Mediterranean Games gold medalists for Turkey
Mediterranean Games medalists in weightlifting
Competitors at the 1997 Mediterranean Games
European Weightlifting Championships medalists
World Weightlifting Championships medalists
20th-century Turkish people
21st-century Turkish people